Annals of African Medicine is a peer-reviewed open access medical journal covering all aspects of medicine, in particular in relation to Africa. It was established in 2002 and is published by Medknow Publications on behalf of the African Medicine Society. The editor-in-chief is Emmanuel A. Ameh.

Abstracting and indexing 
The journal is abstracted and indexed in:

External links 
 

Health in Africa
Open access journals
Quarterly journals
English-language journals
Medknow Publications academic journals
Publications established in 2002
General medical journals
Academic journals associated with learned and professional societies